Robert Pender (born 5 November 1891) was a Scottish footballer who played for Dumbarton, St Mirren, Johnstone, Raith Rovers, Middlesbrough and St Johnstone.

References

1891 births
Scottish footballers
Dumbarton F.C. players
Raith Rovers F.C. players
Middlesbrough F.C. players
Scottish Football League players
English Football League players
St Mirren F.C. players
St Johnstone F.C. players
Year of death missing
Association footballers not categorized by position